Thirsk is a town in North Yorkshire, England.

Thirsk may also refer to

People
Jason Thirsk (1967-1996), American musician
Joan Thirsk (1922-2013), British historian
Kristy Thirsk, Canadian singer-songwriter
Robert Thirsk (born 1953), Canadian engineer and astronaut
Simon Thirsk (born 1977), South African swimmer

Others
Thirsk Mead Hall, a location in The Elder Scrolls III: Bloodmoon and The Elder Scrolls V: Skyrim – Dragonborn